Radio Vision 2000 is a radio station in Port-au-Prince, Haiti that broadcasts sports and national news, along with music. It is one of the most popular radio stations in Haiti.

See also
 Media of Haiti

External links
 Listen Online on ZenoLive
 Listen Online on Haiti Media Live

Radio stations in Haiti